Aymane Mourid (born 7 May 2000) is a Moroccan professional footballer who plays for Union de Touarga. Mainly a central midfielder, he can also play as a central defender.

Club career
Mourid was born in Casablanca, and joined CD Leganés' youth setup in June 2018, from Mohammed VI Football Academy. Initially assigned to the Juvenil A squad, he made his senior debut with the reserves on 20 January 2019, starting in a 0–2 Tercera División away loss against CD Móstoles URJC.

Definitely promoted to the B-team for 2019–20, Mourid scored his first senior goal on 15 September 2019, netting the winner in a 2–1 away success over CA Pinto. He made his first team debut on 17 December, coming on as a late substitute for Javier Eraso in a 1–1 away draw against FC Andorra, for the season's Copa del Rey; he also converted his penalty kick in the 6–5 shoot-out win.

On 1 July 2020, Mourid signed for Lega permanently on a four-year contract. On 5 November, however, he was loaned to SCC Mohammédia for one year.

After making his debut for Chabab in the Moroccan Throne Cup, Mourid made his professional debut on 14 February 2021, starting in a 0–1 Botola Pro home loss against Mouloudia Oujda.

References

External links

2000 births
Living people
Footballers from Casablanca
Moroccan footballers
Association football midfielders
Segunda Federación players
Tercera División players
CD Leganés B players
CD Leganés players
Botola players
SCC Mohammédia players
Morocco under-20 international footballers
Moroccan expatriate footballers
Moroccan expatriate sportspeople in Spain
Expatriate footballers in Spain